Des Lacs National Wildlife Refuge Complex is a National Wildlife Refuge complex in the state of North Dakota.

Refuges within the complex
 Crosby Wetland Management District
 Lake Zahl National Wildlife Refuge
 Des Lacs National Wildlife Refuge
 Lostwood National Wildlife Refuge
 Lostwood Wetland Management District

References
Complex website 

National Wildlife Refuges in North Dakota